Keith Whitley: A Tribute Album is a tribute album to American country music singer Keith Whitley. It was released in 1994 via BNA Records.

Content
The album includes renditions of Keith Whitley's songs by various country music artists, as well as the original tune "Little Boy Lost", co-written and sung by Daron Norwood, and four previously unreleased songs from Whitley himself: "I'm Gonna Hurt Her on the Radio", "Charlotte's in North Carolina", "The Comeback Kid", and "I Just Want You", on which his widow, Lorrie Morgan, was dubbed in as a duet partner. The final track, "A Voice Still Rings True", is an original composition as well, credited to the "All-Star Band". It features John Anderson, Steve Wariner, Sawyer Brown, Joe Diffie, and Ricky Skaggs on lead vocals, with backing vocals including Tanya Tucker, Mark Collie, T. Graham Brown, Deborah Allen, Rhonda Vincent, Dean Dillon, Turner Nichols, Earl Thomas Conley, Larry Cordle, and Ken Mellons.

Alison Krauss's rendition of "When You Say Nothing at All" was released as a single from the album in 1995.

Critical reception
An uncredited review in Allmusic gave the album 4 stars out of 5, praising the performances of Alan Jackson, Diamond Rio, Alison Krauss, and Joe Diffie in particular. People also reviewed the album favorably, with an also uncredited review saying that "But while the artists paying their respects do their best to capture the spirit of Whitley's originals, it is the four previously unreleased cuts sung by the man himself…that ultimately prove to be the most satisfying." Alanna Nash of Entertainment Weekly was less favorable, saying that "only Morgan and [Mark] Chesnutt match Whitley's pained intensity" and giving the album a "C+".

Track listing

Chart performance

Weekly charts

Year-end charts

References

BNA Records albums
Keith Whitley tribute albums
1994 albums